"Sorrow" is a song written by Brett Gurewitz and Greg Graffin, and performed by Bad Religion. It was the first single to be released from their twelfth studio album, The Process of Belief, which was released in 2002, although the single was first played in the fall of 2001 by the L.A. radio station KROQ. An acoustic version impacted radio on June 24, 2008.

Composition
"Sorrow" was inspired by the biblical figure Job, with Gurewitz saying it was "very difficult to account for suffering in the world from a theological perspective". The song opens with a Police-esque ska beat, before switching to the band's typical melodic hardcore sound.

Charts

References

External links

Bad Religion songs
2001 singles
Songs written by Brett Gurewitz
Songs critical of religion
2001 songs
2000s ballads
Rock ballads
Epitaph Records singles